Suji may refer to:

Food
 Suji, a Japanese dish made from tendons; see tendon as food
 The South Asian name for semolina, a food ingredient

People
 Su-ji, a Korean given name (and a list of people with various English spellings of the name)
 Martin Suji (born 1971), Kenyan cricketer
 Tony Suji (born 1976), Kenyan cricketer

Places
 Suji-gu, a city district in Yongin City, South Korea, approximately 40km south of Seoul
 Suji, Kilimanjaro, a small village in the north-eastern region of Tanzania 
 Suji railway station, Inner Mongolia, China

See also
 Sooji (disambiguation)
 Suji Uttapam, a variant of Uttapam, a South Indian thick pancake
 Jisu (disambiguation), including Ji-Su values
 Su (disambiguation)
 Ji (disambiguation)